Football Club Kallon, commonly known as F.C. Kallon, is a football club based in Freetown, Sierra Leone. Founded as Sierra Fisheries, the club is one of the top clubs in the Sierra Leone National Premier League and play their home games at the National Stadium in Freetown.

Honours
Sierra Leone League: 4
 1982, 1986, 1987 (as Sierra Fisheries)
 2006

Sierra Leonean FA Cup: 1
 2007

Performance in CAF competitions
CAF Champions League: 1 appearance
2007 – First Round

African Cup of Champions Clubs: 2 appearances
1983: Second Round
1988: Preliminary Round

CAF Confederation Cup: 1 appearance
2012 –

Players

References

Football clubs in Sierra Leone
Association football clubs established in 2002
Sport in Freetown
2002 establishments in Sierra Leone